Cardal Publishing was a British magazine and comic book publisher active during the Golden Age of comics, based in Manchester, England.

The company's publications included erotic fiction and Western novellas, as well as comics.

According to comic historian and critic Steve Holland, cash flow problems caused by obscenity fines forced the firm out of business before the end of the 1940s. The company was liquidated in 1951.

The indicia to Streamline Comics notes that the comic was printed by The Assurance Agents Press, 132-4 Great Ancoats St, which was one street over from Cardal's Ducie Street offices.

Popular fiction magazines
 Western Magazine (c. 1947)
 Girls' Journal (Aug 1947)  
 Gay-etty (c.1949)   – erotic fiction
 Winter Frolics (1 issue?) (c. 1949)  – erotic fiction

Other magazines
 Girl's Review (1947) (1 issue)

Novels
 The Man who Rode by Night, by Dick Sharples – pocket Western
 One Man's War, by Hank Johnson (1949) – pocket Western

The Man Who Rode by Night / One Man's War were published in a single edition in the U.S.

Comics
 Streamline Comics #1–4 (1947)
 New Worlds Comic (1947, reprint)

References

Comic book publishing companies of the United Kingdom